Luke's College is one of the oldest schools in Sri Lanka situated in Ratnapura, Sabaragamuwa Province, Sri Lanka.

History 
St. Luke's College is one of the oldest schools in Sri Lanka. It was established in  adjacent to St. Luke's Church. Situated in the heart of Ratnapura city, it has been the alma mater for some distinguished citizens in Sri Lanka.

College Motto 
"Vincit veritas", which means "truth conquers" in Latin.

Provincial schools in Sri Lanka
Schools in Ratnapura
Educational institutions established in 1848
1848 establishments in Ceylon